Sebastián Enrique Domínguez (born July 29, 1980) is an Argentine former footballer who played as a centre back. He is currently assistant coach to Hernán Crespo at Qatari first division side Al-Duhail SC.

Dominguez' professional football career spanned 19 years during which he played for teams in Argentina, Brazil and Mexico, winning titles with all but one.

Early life
Domínguez was born in Buenos Aires and moved to Rosario at an early age with the relocation of his parents'. There, he played in the youth system of Newell's Old Boys. His father coached Lionel Messi in the club's youth divisions.

Club career
Dominguez made his professional debut for Newell's Old Boys in 1998, at 18 years. At an early age he was purchased by a third-party and loaned to Talleres de Córdoba along with his teammate Maxi Rodríguez, but he was never authorized to play for the club and returned to Newell's shortly after. He played as a defensive midfielder until 2004, when he was moved to centre back by coach Américo Gallego and he captained the team that won the 2004 Apertura tournament, thus breaking the club's 12-year title drought. The central defender played 18 games (out of 19) during the tournament, all of them as a starter.

After winning the league championship with Newell's, Domínguez was purchased by third-party Media Sports Investment for $2.5 million (US), that loaned him along with fellow Argentine players Carlos Tevez and Javier Mascherano to Brazilian side SC Corinthians. With his new club, he won the 2005 Campeonato Brasileiro Série A.

During the 2007 January transfer window, Domínguez returned to Argentina to play for Estudiantes de La Plata, under Diego Simeone's coaching. He played with the team the whole year, after which he was signed by Mexico side América in January 2008. Although he helped the team to win the 2008 InterLiga and scored in the derby against Chivas de Guadalajara, he was released from his contract at year-end.
 
On 27 January 2009, Vélez Sársfield signed the defender on a free transfer. He immediately established himself as a starter as center back playing along Nicolás Otamendi. Domínguez featured in all 19 games of his first tournament in Vélez, the 2009 Clausura, helping the team to claim the national championship. He was also a regular along Fernando Ortiz as centre back in Vélez' 2011 Clausura winning campaign (playing 16 games), as well as the team's 2011 Copa Libertadores semi-finalist campaign (playing all 12 games and scoring one goal). Domínguez also helped Vélez to win the 2012 Inicial, starting 18 games and scoring two goals. In that year he was also selected by the fans of Vélez on an online poll as the club's best player of the year.

In 2013, the defender obtained two further titles with Vélez: the 2012–13 Superfinal (defeating his former team Newell's Old Boys) and the 2013 Supercopa Argentina (defeating Arsenal de Sarandí), in both of which he was a starter for his team. During that year Domínguez also played his 200th official game with the club in a 1–1 draw with All Boys.

International career
On 31 August 2009 Domínguez was called up by coach Diego Maradona for the Argentina national team, along fellow Vélez Sársfield teammates Nicolás Otamendi and Emiliano Papa. With Argentina, the defender started the World Cup qualifier games against Brazil and Paraguay (both defeats for Argentina).

Domínguez was later called by coach Alejandro Sabella for the 2011 and 2012 editions of the friendly competition Superclásico de las Américas, in which he captained the national team. He was also called by Sabella for 2014 World Cup qualifying matches, including the last two against Peru and Uruguay. However, he did not take part of the squad for the World Cup.

Personal life
Domínguez studied architecture, but did not get far in his career. He plays guitar and harmonica and enjoys Argentine and British rock.

In 2014, Domínguez graduated as a football coach in Argentina.

In November 2020, Domínguez spoke about homosexuality in association football, saying that it is a problem for footballers to not "interpret, understand, and accept" homosexuals and that it was a "debt" that footballers had with the gay community. He went on to say that footballers were "cavemen" regarding homosexuality and said that it did not matter "whether [you] are gay to play football."

Titles
Newell's Old Boys
Argentine Primera División (1): 2004 Apertura
Corinthians
Campeonato Brasileiro Série A (1): 2005
América
InterLiga (1): 2008
Vélez Sársfield
Argentine Primera División (4): 2009 Clausura, 2011 Clausura, 2012 Inicial, 2012–13 Superfinal
Supercopa Argentina (1): 2013

References

External links
  
 Profile at Vélez Sársfield official website 
 
 
 
 
 

Living people
1980 births
Footballers from Buenos Aires
Association football central defenders
Argentine footballers
Argentina international footballers
Argentine expatriate footballers
Argentine Primera División players
Campeonato Brasileiro Série A players
Liga MX players
Newell's Old Boys footballers
Estudiantes de La Plata footballers
Club Atlético Vélez Sarsfield footballers
Sport Club Corinthians Paulista players
Club América footballers
Expatriate footballers in Brazil
Expatriate footballers in Mexico
Argentine expatriate sportspeople in Brazil
Argentine expatriate sportspeople in Mexico